The Buca-Bornova Tunnel is the unofficial name of the  tunnel, currently under construction, in İzmir, Turkey. The tunnel is part of a  express route that will connect the İzmir Coach Terminal, in Bornova, to central Konak, via the Konak Tunnel. Once completed, the tunnel will become the longest tunnel in the İzmir Province and the 14th longest in Turkey. Work began on 12 March 2018 and the estimated construction cost is ₺184 million.

References

Road tunnels in Turkey
Buildings and structures in İzmir
Konak District
Buca District
Bornova District